Antonio Marenzi (22 September 1596 – 22 October 1662) was a Roman Catholic prelate who served as Bishop of Trieste (1646–1662) and Bishop of Pedena (1637–1646).

Biography
Marenzi was born in Trieste on 22 September 1596. On 30 January 1635, he was selected as Bishop of Pedena and confirmed by Pope Urban VIII on 17 August 1637. On 17 October 1638, he was consecrated bishop by Alessandro Cesarini (iuniore), Cardinal-Deacon of Sant'Eustachio, with Alfonso Gonzaga, Titular Archbishop of Rhodus, and Giovanni Battista Altieri, Bishop Emeritus of Camerino, serving as co-consecrators. On 26 April 1646, he was selected as Bishop of Trieste and confirmed by Pope Innocent X on 10 September 1646. He served as Bishop of Trieste until his death on 22 October 1662.

References

External links and additional sources
 (for Chronology of Bishops)
 (for Chronology of Bishops)

17th-century Italian Roman Catholic bishops
Bishops appointed by Pope Urban VIII
Bishops appointed by Pope Gregory XIII
1596 births
1662 deaths